Dickebusch may refer to:

 Dickebusch New Military Commonwealth War Graves Commission Cemetery and Extension, Belgium
 Dickebusch Old Military Commonwealth War Graves Commission Cemetery, Belgium
  or Dickebusch, a former village in Belgium, now part of Ypres